H38 may refer to:
 Hanriot H.38, a French flying boat
 , a Royal Navy D-class destroyer
 Hoffmann H38 Observer, an experimental aircraft